= Borders, Asylum and Global Non-Citizenship =

2014 non-fiction book by Heather L. Johnson

Borders, Asylum and Global Non-Citizenship: The Other Side of the Fence
- Author: Heather L. Johnson
- Publisher: Cambridge University Press
- Publication date: 2014
- ISBN: 978-1107061835

Borders, Asylum and Global Non-Citizenship: The Other Side of the Fence is a non-fiction book by Heather L. Johnson. It was published in 2014 by Cambridge University Press.

== General references ==
- Albahari, Maurizio (2016). "Borders, Asylum and Global Non-Citizenship: The Other Side of the Fence by Heather L. Johnson". Human Rights Quarterly. 38 (2): 519–522. doi:10.1353/hrq.2016.0026. ISSN 1085-794X.
- Lynn Doty, Roxanne (July 2015). "Borders, Asylum and Global Non-Citizenship: The Other Side of the Fence . By Heather L. Johnson. Cambridge: Cambridge University Press, 2014". The Journal of Politics. 77 (3): e5–e6. doi:10.1086/681891. ISSN 0022-3816.
